Kelvin Peter Etuhu (born 30 May 1988) is a Nigerian former professional footballer. Etuhu has two older brothers, Dickson Etuhu, also a professional footballer, and Michael Etuhu. He played as a striker or as a winger.

Club career

Early career
Etuhu joined Manchester City's academy when he was fourteen. After scoring the winning goal in the semi-finals of the 2005–06 FA Youth Cup against Manchester United, he went on to play in the finals in which Manchester City lost to Liverpool 3–2 on aggregate.

In 2007, Etuhu was loaned to Rochdale. He scored on his debut for the club, coming on in the 56th minute against Wycombe Wanderers and scoring in the 80th minute. His spell at Rochdale was cut short by a knee injury which prompted his return to Manchester City.

He made his first appearance for Manchester City on 25 September 2007 against Norwich City in the League Cup, coming on as a substitute and setting up the winning goal for Georgios Samaras. On 15 December 2007, Etuhu scored his first goal in the Premier League against Bolton Wanderers as Manchester City won 4–2. Following this appearance, he signed a contract with the club until the end of the 2009–10 season.

Loan at Leicester City
On Tuesday, 4 March 2008, Etuhu joined Leicester City on loan until the end of the 2007–08 season. He made his debut four days later, on 8 March, in 0–0 draw against Bristol City. He made two consecutive starts before being dropped to bench against West Bromwich Albion on 15 March, coming on in the 88th minute. Due to new signing David Bell from Luton Town, Etuhu spent the final two months of his loan on bench, making brief appearances for the Foxes. Leicester were relegated at the end of the season.

Loan at Cardiff City
On 22 August 2009 Etuhu joined Football League Championship side Cardiff City on a season-long loan, making his debut the following day as a replacement for Michael Chopra during a 3–0 win over Bristol City in the Severnside derby, before making his first start in another Severnside derby against Bristol Rovers in the second round of the League Cup. However, he suffered an injury in his fourth appearance with the side when he damaged ankle ligaments during a 1–0 defeat to Newcastle United, ruling him out for up to two months. He made his return on 29 November 2009 during a 2–1 defeat to Ipswich Town, coming on as a substitute for Chris Burke. On 8 December, he made his first League start for Cardiff against West Brom at the Hawthorns, as Cardiff won 2–0.

Cardiff reached the Championship play-off final at Wembley, and Etuhu played in the game, coming on for an injured Jay Bothroyd. Cardiff took the lead twice, but eventually lost the game 3–2.

Etuhu was not included in Manchester City's Premier League squad for the 2010–11 season. and was released from his contract in March 2011, following his jailing for an assault outside a Manchester casino.

Portsmouth
On 19 January 2012, Etuhu signed for Portsmouth. He made his debut in the 3–2 defeat to Cardiff City on 21 January. He scored his first Portsmouth goal in his side's 4–1 victory over Birmingham City at Fratton Park on 20 March 2012.

After the season's final game with Portsmouth relegated, Etuhu expressed his desire to stay at the club and try to help them bounce back. Both Bradford City and Barnsley expressed an interest in signing him, while Portsmouth offered him a two-year contract.

Barnsley
However, on 8 June 2012, Etuhu agreed to sign for Barnsley on a one-year contract. He made his debut for the club in the opening game of the season, coming on as a substitute in the 17th minute, in a 1–0 win over Middlesbrough. However, under the management of Keith Hill, Etuhu's playing time decreased, but after Hill's replacement by David Flitcroft, he was selected more often, with Flitcroft placing him in the central-midfield. In a 1–0 win over Watford on 16 March 2013, his performance earned him a man of the match award. In his first season, Etuhu made thirty appearances in all competitions. At the end of the season, Etuhu was retained for another season, after which he signed a two-year deal.

After two years at Barnsley, Etuthu was among ten players to leave the club.

Bury
On 27 June 2014 Bury announced that Etuhu had signed a two-year deal after his release from Barnsley. Upon joining the club, Etuhu was given number six shirt this season.

Etuhu made his Bury debut on 16 August 2014, in a 2–0 win over Hartlepool United. Having established himself in the first team at Bury throughout the season, playing in various midfielder position, Etuhu scored his first goal for the club in a 2–0 win over Tranmere Rovers on 4 October 2014. At the end of the 2014–15 season in which he made 46 appearances and scored twice in all competitions, Etuhu was offered a new contract by the club, which he signed a two-year contract extension on 22 May 2015.

Carlisle United
On 29 June 2017, Etuhu signed for Carlisle United on a free transfer, signing a two–year contract. Upon joining the club, he was given a number 21 shirt. On 12 September, he made his debut for Carlisle United, playing 77 minutes before being substituted, in a 2–0 loss to Coventry City. He scored his first goal for the club on 25 November in a 1–1 draw against Morecambe.

On 18 January 2019, Carlisle United opted to trigger their option of a contract extension that would ensure Etuhu remained under contract for another season. He then suffered a number of hamstring injuries, keeping him sidelined for an extensive period. By September, manager Steven Pressley said he was unsure on when Etuhu would return from his injury. His hopes of returning was interrupted by the COVID-19 pandemic, causing the season to end immediately. Having made no appearances in the 2019–20 season, he was released by the club.

After being released by Carlisle United, Etuhu announced his retirement from football.

International career
Although not capped at international level, Etuhu was eligible to play for England or Nigeria. He said his intention was to play for England. He had previously represented England at junior levels while at Manchester City. In May 2009 he declared his intention to pursue an international career with Nigeria.

Personal life
Born in Kano, Nigeria, Etuhu moved to England a young age and grew up in Peckham, South London and he attended Saint Thomas the Apostle boys school before his family moved up to Manchester. Growing up with four brothers, Kelvin said he and Dickson were "the athletes in the family" and considered his older brother as an inspiration to motivate him to become a footballer.

On 13 July 2010, Etuhu was arrested on charges relating to an assault outside a Manchester casino in February. Three people were injured, he was charged with assault and appeared before the magistrates on 6 August 2010. He was given an eight-month jail sentence on 24 March 2011, after which Manchester City released him from his contract. In August 2011, he was released from prison, having served five months to his jail sentence. He later said "I made a mistake, people make mistakes, but I learned the hard way. Harder than maybe I should have learned but I am positive nothing like that will happen again. Today I would react a lot differently to what I did then. I have learned, I have definitely learned."

In March 2019, Etuhu became a father when his partner gave birth to a baby boy, causing him to miss two matches. In October 2020, he took part in helping the development of 250 young players across the borough at R-Kikx Academy.

Club statistics

Club

References

External links
 

1988 births
Living people
Nigerian footballers
English footballers
Sportspeople from Kano
Nigerian emigrants to the United Kingdom
Association football wingers
Association football forwards
Manchester City F.C. players
Rochdale A.F.C. players
Leicester City F.C. players
Cardiff City F.C. players
Portsmouth F.C. players
Barnsley F.C. players
Bury F.C. players
Carlisle United F.C. players
Premier League players
English Football League players
Black British sportspeople
British people convicted of assault
Prisoners and detainees of England and Wales